Hasteh Kuh (also Romanized as Hasteh Kūh) is a village in Mehran Rural District, in the Central District of Bandar Lengeh County, Hormozgan Province, Iran. At the 2006 census, its population was 50, in 15 families.

References 

Populated places in Bandar Lengeh County